The United States District Court for the Northern District of Georgia (in case citations, N.D. Ga.) is a United States district court which serves the residents of forty-six counties. These are divided up into four divisions.

Appeals from cases brought in the Northern District of Georgia are to the United States Court of Appeals for the Eleventh Circuit (except for patent claims and claims against the U.S. government under the Tucker Act, which are appealed to the Federal Circuit).

History 
The United States District Court for the District of Georgia was one of the original 13 courts established by the Judiciary Act of 1789, on September 24, 1789.

Jurisdiction 

The Atlanta division includes: Cherokee, Clayton, Cobb, DeKalb, Douglas, Fulton, Gwinnett, Henry, Newton, and Rockdale counties.

The Gainesville division serves: Banks, Barrow, Dawson, Fannin, Forsyth, Gilmer,  Habersham, Hall, Jackson, Lumpkin, Pickens, Rabun, Stephens, Towns, Union, and White counties.

The Newnan division hears cases for: Carroll, Coweta, Fayette, Haralson,  Heard, Meriwether, Pike, Spalding, and Troup counties.

The Rome division serves: Bartow, Catoosa, Chattooga, Dade, Floyd, Gordon, Murray, Paulding, Polk, Walker, and Whitfield counties.

The United States Attorney's Office for the Northern District of Georgia represents the United States in civil and criminal litigation in the court.

, the United States Attorney is Ryan K. Buchanan.

Current judges 
:

Former judges

Chief judges

Succession of seats

See also 
 Courts of Georgia
 Garcia-Mir v. Meese
 List of current United States district judges
 List of United States federal courthouses in Georgia

References

External links 
 Home of Northern District of Georgia

Georgia, Northern District
Georgia (U.S. state) law
Organizations based in Atlanta
Gainesville, Georgia
Coweta County, Georgia
Rome, Georgia
1848 establishments in Georgia (U.S. state)
Courts and tribunals established in 1848